Moinabad (also Romanized as Mo‘īnābād) is a village in Pishva Rural District, in the Central District of Pishva County, Tehran Province, Iran. At the 2006 census, its population was 657, in 158 families.

References 

Populated places in Pishva County